Irene Antonia Gargantini (born 1934) is an Italian-Canadian retired computer scientist and numerical analyst, known for her research on root-finding algorithms and quadtrees and octrees, and in particular for introducing the use of hash tables in place of pointer-based structures for representing quadtrees and octrees. In her retirement as a professor emerita at the University of Western Ontario, she has also become a self-published novelist under the pseudonym René Natan.

Early life and education
Gargantini was born in 1934 in Milan, the daughter of a railroad engineer. With the encouragement of her parents, she studied physics at the University of Milan, and after earning a doctorate there, she became a researcher at the university, where her work involved the calculation of electron trajectories in synchrotrons, using a computer from the Computer Research Corporation.

Career and later life
She continued her work on computer-assisted physics calculations at the European Atomic Energy Community beginning in 1958, and at IBM Research in Switzerland beginning in 1965. There, her interests began shifting to the newly established field of numerical analysis.

After seeing an announcement in the Communications of the ACM for a new computer science program at the University of Western Ontario in Canada, headed by John Hart (whose research she had used at IBM), she took a faculty position in the program, beginning in 1968. She became department chair from 1986 to 1991, becoming the first female chair of a computer science department in Canada. She retired in 2000.

Selected publications
Gargantini's research publications include:

References

External links
Réne Natan official website

1934 births
Living people
Canadian computer scientists
Canadian women computer scientists
Numerical analysts
University of Milan alumni
Academic staff of the University of Western Ontario